The Sharks (known as the Cell C Sharks for sponsorship reasons) are a South Africa rugby union team that participates in the annual Currie Cup tournament. The Sharks are the current representative team of the KwaZulu-Natal Rugby Union and they draw most of their players from the KwaZulu-Natal Province.

The team is the third most successful provincial union in the Currie Cup, having won the competition eight times. Natal won its first Currie Cup in 1990, the same year the union celebrated its centenary. Since then the Sharks have won the Currie Cup in 1992, 1995, 1996, 2008, 2010, 2013 and most recently in 2018.

The KwaZulu-Natal Rugby Union are the majority owner of the Sharks franchise who compete in the United Rugby Championship. They also play in Durban and represent the province of KwaZulu-Natal. For most of Super Rugby history, the Sharks Super Rugby franchise drew players from a much larger area than the Sharks provincial union, with the rugby unions of Border, based in East London and Eastern Province from Port Elizabeth included in the Sharks franchise. Since 2013 the Southern Kings functions on its own, and no longer supplies players to the Sharks franchise.

History

Early history
The Natal Rugby Union, renamed the KwaZulu-Natal Rugby Union (KZNRU) in 1999 was formed in 1890, but it took 66 years for the union to enjoy its first Currie Cup final. In the interim, the province did produce its fair share of quality players, including Springboks Bill Payn, Wally Clarkson and Philip Nel, who led South Africa on the country's unbeaten tour of Australia and New Zealand in 1937. Whilst the 1920s and 30s saw Natal improve from one of the weakest unions in the Currie Cup to becoming a more competitive mid-table team, the team still struggled against the quality of sides such as Western Province and Transvaal.

1920-1990: The years of pain

Natal didn't enjoy any success prior to the 1960s, although legendary coach Izak van Heerden did manage to fashion two unbeaten seasons in ’61 and ’63, when the Currie Cup competition wasn’t held. The 1956 final saw Natal up against Northern Transvaal and even though it was contested at Kingsmead in Durban, 9-8 was the score in favour of the men from Pretoria. With so many Springbok test matches in the early 1960s, the Currie Cup was contested only four times in that decade. Natal failed to make an impression, despite being able to call on the likes of Springboks Ormond Taylor and Keith Oxlee. But the province did succeed in building its own unique style of exciting rugby, thanks to the foresight and genius of Van Heerden. Van Heerden, who coached Natal from the late 1950s into the 1960s, was ahead of his time, fostering a brand of rugby that placed so much emphasis on ball retention and the interplay of forwards and backs to produce try-scoring opportunities. Nonetheless, Natal saw very little success in the 1970s, until the arrival of Wynand Claassen from Pretoria in late 1979. What followed was a rare third-place finish in the Currie Cup in 1980, with Claassen receiving inspirational support from Welshman Roger Gardner and former Wallaby Mark Loane. The standout result was a 22-19 defeat of Northern Transvaal – Natal’s first win over Northern's at Loftus Versfeld in 41 years. Northern Transvaal went on to win the Currie Cup again that year, but Natal was the only side to get the better of them.

1981-1985: Relegation to Section B
During the 80s, Natal could call on players of the calibre of Gawie Visagie, Henry Coxwell, Rob Hankinson and Mort Mortassagne, but relegation to the B-Section followed in ’81. The side made up for this in 1984 by qualifying for the Currie Cup final, despite plying their trade in the B-Section. That was after a stunning semi-final victory over Free State, thanks to two tries from Des McLean and one each from Derek la Marque and Claassen. The "Banana Boys" gave a good account of themselves in the 1984 final, but Western Province were too good, winning 19-9 at Newlands in Cape Town. For much of the 1980s, Natal was written off as a B-Section team punching above their weight. It wasn't until the arrival of legendary coach Ian McIntosh from Zimbabwe and the return to the A-Section in 1987 that they started to lay the foundations for success in the 1990s.

1986-1990: Return to Section A and first Currie Cup title
After arriving in 1986, McIntosh quickly made his mark in Durban and spent the late 1980s building a squad and recruiting players he felt would serve the greater good of Natal Rugby. That culminated in a dream 1990 Currie Cup season, which saw Natal sweep aside just about all before them, with only a heavy round-robin defeat to Northern Transvaal  playing on their minds as they traveled north to face the same opponents in the final. Despite Natal's great season, the men from Pretoria were heavily favoured to win, particularly in front of a partisan home crowd that had become accustomed to Currie Cup success. And with match-winning flyhalf Naas Botha at the helm, it was widely accepted that the Blue Bulls just had to show up to win. But, in one of the biggest upsets in the history of the competition, McIntosh's side turned the tables and edged out their more-fancied opponents 18-12, after a match-winning try from flying winger Tony Watson. The victorious side was captained by scrumhalf Craig Jamieson, who led the team on a ticker-tape parade through central Durban later in the week. The victory was especially poignant for being both Natal's first, and for occurring in the union's centenary year. Players from that history-making team included fullback Hugh Reece-Edwards and centres Dick Muir and Jeremy Thomson. But the hard work was done upfront by Gerhard Harding, Tom Lawton and Guy Kebble in the front row, backed up by the lock pairing of Andre Botha and Rudi Visagie, flank Wahl Bartmann and eighth man Andrew Aitken. McIntosh produced a masterstroke by naming regular lock Steve Atherton on the flank just minutes before kick-off. It resulted in what was arguably Natal's heaviest-ever scrum and laid the platform for the Durban side to put the required pressure on Blue Bulls scrumhalf Robert du Preez and Botha.

1990-1999: Team of the Decade and the rise of the Sharks
That 1990 victory was the catalyst for further Currie Cup success, as McIntosh set about ensuring continuity that culminated in Natal being labelled the "team of the ‘90s" a decade later. During this time, the province also recruited wisely, with the likes of Du Preez, fullback Andre Joubert, flyhalf Henry Honiball, centre Pieter Muller and prop Ollie le Roux all making the trip to Durban to seek greater fortune. Another shrewd acquisition was tireless flanker Bartmann from Transvaal, and 1992 saw him lead Natal to a second Currie Cup triumph – this time away from home. Francois Pienaar's powerful Transvaal unit were defeated 14-13 in the final at Ellis Park. A 21-15 Currie Cup final defeat to the same opponents followed in 1993 – a loss that was made all the more difficult because it took place in front of an expectant home crowd at Kings Park. But the newly branded Sharks were back in the winner's circle just two years later. By now, players such as locks Mark Andrews and Atherton, hooker John Allan, eighth man Gary Teichmann, prop Adrian Garvey, wing Cabous van der Westhuizen and scrumhalf Kevin Putt were all household names and either current or future Springbok stars. Making the most of a memorable World Cup year which saw the Springboks claim a historic first world title, McIntosh also recruited Frenchmen Olivier Roumat and Thierry Lacroix to bolster what was already a highly talented squad. It proved a masterstroke, with the big lock and flyhalf playing important roles in the 1995 final victory over Western Province in Durban. The final score was 25-17, with the Sharks able to celebrate a third Currie Cup success in six years. With the likes of legendary fullback Joubert now entering their prime, along with a new crop of Sharks heroes in the form of flank Wayne Fyvie and prop Robbi Kempson, further success followed in 1996 with the Natal securing their first back-to-back Currie Cup titles. Such was their dominance in that year that McIntosh's side was able to travel away to Ellis Park and convincingly beat Transvaal 33-15, with Joubert grabbing the man-of-the-match award with a stunning two-try performance. It was surprising, then, that the team from Durban had to wait until 1999 to contest another final, with the likes of Western Province, Free State Cheetahs and the Northern Transvaal once again coming into their own towards the end of the 1990s. But it was Transvaal, now renamed the Golden Lions, that would cause Natal Currie Cup heartache, as they pitched up in Durban and handed the four-time champions a 32-9 hiding in the 1999 final, with Lions fullback Thinus Delport scoring twice in a match-winning performance. Despite the best efforts of their rising star, under-21 flyhallf Cobus Gomes who kicked 3 penalties and scored what was arguably the try of the season only to have it reversed due to ill-discipline in the scrum prior to the line break. That signaled the end of an era, with McIntosh, inspirational captain Teichmann, Honiball and Joubert all announcing their retirements.

2000-2009: Growing International Influence
With Rudolf Straeuli now at the helm and future Springbok captain John Smit at the forefront of a Sharks revival, they were able to overcome those huge losses and qualify for the 2000 final. But Western Province was too strong at Kings Park in Durban, as The Sharks went down by 25 points to 15. It was a case of deja vu just 12 months later, but this time at Newlands in Cape Town. The score was 29-24 on that occasion, as Western Province enjoyed a period of dominance over their coastal rivals from Durban. The Sharks bounced back to feature in the 2003 final, but a heavy 40-19 Currie Cup final defeat to the Blue Bulls in Pretoria followed and that was to signal the start of a barren period for the province. It wasn't until 2008, with New Zealander John Plumtree in charge, that The Sharks were able to break the curse and once again claim Currie Cup glory. Northern Transvaal, by now renamed the Blue Bulls, were their opponents in the final, and this time the Kings Park faithful were treated to a gutsy Sharks performance that culminated in an edgy 14-9 victory. It was the fifth Currie Cup title, and like the 1995 final, a French connection in the guise of Frédéric Michalak would again be involved for The Sharks and, with quality young players such as Ruan Pienaar, Rory Kockott, Beast Mtawarira, JP Pietersen, Bismarck du Plessis, Keegan Daniel and Ryan Kankowski in their ranks, the portents for success are clearly present.

2010-2013: Becoming a Force to be Reckoned with
Many of the above-mentioned players, along with some of the stalwarts like John Smit, Stefan Terblanche and Jacques Botes, together with a few new recruits like Willem Alberts and Louis Ludik, and new talent coming through the Sharks Academy made good in 2010 as the team regained the Absa Currie Cup trophy after another successful domestic season. Having finished the pool stages of the tournament at the top of the log, they dispatched of the Blue Bulls in the semi-final and then comprehensively beat Western Province 30-10 in the final - both matches taking place in front of home crowds at The Shark Tank. Young Patrick Lambie was the star of the show, earning the coveted Man of the Match award with his 25 individual points' haul and he, along with Keegan Daniel, Lwazi Mvovo, Willem Alberts and Charl McLeod all went on to gain Springbok honours at the end of the year. The Sharks reached their third final in four years when they finished second on the login 2011, with the Lions finishing top. The Lions had not won a trophy since beating the Sharks in the 1999 Currie Cup final. Despite the odds, a fired-up Lions side emulated the feat of their predecessors of 12 years previously (the Sharks had also suffered a 12-year drought, winning in 1996 and then again in 2008) and ran out winners at a packed Ellis Park in Johannesburg, defeating The Sharks and emerge 2011 Currie Cup champions. It was a similar scenario in 2012 when The Sharks managed, again, to reach the Currie Cup final, hosting it again as they had succeeded in 2008 and 2010. All the signs suggested that they would emulate those feats, but sadly it was Western Province who broke their own 11-year trophy drought in a tight final at Kings Park, with Juan de Jongh dancing through the Sharks defence in the 36th minute to score what would become the match-winning try. The final score was 25-18 in favour of Western Province. However, The Sharks were not to be denied in 2013 when matters were reversed. The final pool match pitted The Sharks and Western Province against one another at Kings Park, the teams one and two on the log. The winner of that match would finish top and thus earn the right to host the final, should they get through. Western Province won 17-13 and finished top of the Currie Cup log, with the Sharks in the second position.
Both teams successfully negotiated their way through the semi-finals, Western Province defeated the Golden Lions 33-16 and The Sharks victorious over Free State - 33-22. The 2013 Currie Cup final was held on 26 October 2013 at Newlands in Cape Town. The home side were overwhelming favourites having beaten the Sharks in both pool matches during the season. It was typical derby stuff; a massive clash between the two best teams in the tournament. But it appeared that The Sharks were hungrier. They hit the rucks with greater passion; they smashed Province in the tackles and took their chances to emerge worthy 33-19 victors, holding out against a late, but ultimately ineffective charge from the home side to be crowned 2013 champions - their third title and fifth final in the tournament since 2008.

The Sharks brand

This brand was conceived, presented and initially executed by Terry Kukle of Tag International Media. The Sharks mascot Sharkie was launched in 1995. To achieve this a substantial budget was allocated to refine this vision that would include the match facilities, the pre-and post-match activities and the team. The local press at first were very hesitant to accept the new name and branding and fans were polarised by the radical proposed change that flew in the face of rugby tradition and convention. After much controversy in the media (which very rapidly brought the proposed brand to everyone's attention) and a very successful season supported by great products and promotions, the Sharks were embraced by all. The Sharks' marketing has been widely acknowledged in marketing and rugby circles as best practice and included as a successful case study in many marketing textbooks.

There was initially significant resistance from many quarters. This resistance was ascribed to the traditional attitudes of the rugby-loving stakeholders. However, the strategy was successful and the success of the marketing has been widely acknowledged. Crowd attendances, merchandising, suite holder and season ticket sales have all been very successful. The brand is now internationally recognised and the branding strategy is reaping dividends for all its stakeholders. As a result, since the mid-1990s the Sharks have become one of the most well-recognised and popular unions in the South African rugby landscape.  The Sharks are well supported across South Africa, with sizable fan bases in all major cities including Johannesburg, Pretoria, Port Elizabeth and Cape Town. Most of their supporters however live in KwaZulu-Natal Province, particularly in and around Durban and Pietermaritzburg.

Rivalries
Over the years the Sharks have developed a number of major rivalries, particularly since the 1990s and their emergence as a dominant force in the Currie Cup. Perhaps their most long-standing rivalry is that of their old foes Northern Transvaal/Blue Bulls. The Sharks first-ever Currie Cup final victory came against Northern Transvaal in Pretoria in 1990 and since then the two teams have played out a number of classic encounters including the 2007 Super Rugby Final in Durban where the Bulls were victorious by the narrowest of margins in front of a packed Kings Park Stadium. The Sharks also have a fierce rivalry against Transvaal/Golden Lions. The teams contested a number of finals throughout the 1990s and whilst the rivalry diminished somewhat during the 2000s it was reignited following the Lions defeat of the Sharks in the 2011 Currie Cup Final in Johannesburg. Being the two most successful coastal teams in the country, a strong rivalry also exists between the Sharks and Western Province, and the two teams participate in what's known as the 'coastal derby' when they take on each other.

KwaZulu-Natal Rugby Union
The KwaZulu-Natal Rugby Union was founded as the Natal Rugby Union in 1890 and is one of the oldest unions in the country. The KwaZulu-Natal Rugby Union is the major shareholder in the Sharks, and is responsible for the administration of club rugby in the province of KwaZulu-Natal. Well, known clubs in the region include Rovers, Durban Collegians, the University of KwaZulu-Natal (formerly University of Natal), Varsity College, Amanzimtoti, Durban Crusaders and Westville Old Boys RFC.

The senior clubs in the province compete for the Moor Cup, a magnificent trophy presented in 1876 to George Moor, captain of the "Colonials" in their victory against the "Home-borns" in Kimberly. The trophy found its way to Pietermaritzburg and in 1957 the first KwaZulu-Natal club to win the cup was University of Natal (Durban campus). Since 2013 the Moor Cup has also acted as the qualification process for all non-university Kwa-Zulu Natal clubs to gain entry to the SARU Community Cup, the premier club rugby competition in South Africa for non-university teams. 

The KZNRU also hosts the Murray Cup. An annual 16 team knock out tournament featuring 8 Premier Division teams and 8 First Division teams. The Murray Cup was founded in 1890, and is named after Sir TK Murray. Murray was appointed in June 1890 as the first President of the Natal Rugby Union, which today is known as the KwaZulu-Natal Rugby Union. He presented the union with its first trophy, The Murray Cup.

Other KZNRU tournaments and trophies include: the Wylie Cup, the Optimum Cup, the Findlay Cup, the Walker Cup Third Division, Foaden Bowl Fourth Division, the CF Glew Fifth Division, the Keith Parkinson Trophy, the Frank Norris U20 'A' Trophy, the Kings Park Challenge U20 'B' Trophy and the DW Gewde U20 'B' Knock Out competition.

KwaZulu-Natal is also represented by the Durban University of Technology and the University of KwaZulu-Natal in the annual Varsity Cup/Varsity Shield competitions.

Other teams
In addition to the Sharks Currie Cup team, there are also other teams representing the KwaZulu-Natal Rugby Union in rugby competitions. The Duikers is a club affiliated to the KZNRU that field representative provincial youth and amateur teams, playing in annual matches against the Quaggas (a similar team out of Gauteng) and competing internationally in the Malaysia Tens.

Until 2009, a second senior-tier provincial team was called the Natal Wildebeest, which competed against the Transvaal Rooibokke and later in the Vodacom Cup. In 2010, this team was brought into the professional Sharks set-up and renamed a Sharks XV. This team competes annually in the Vodacom Cup / Currie Cup qualification competitions.

On 7 May 2021 the Sharks announced the Sharks Women team would take part in the South African Women's Premier Division following the failure of the 2020 season to launch during the Covid pandemic and its effect on local rugby in South Africa.

The Sharks Academy

The Sharks Academy claims to be the oldest rugby youth academy in South Africa. The Academy runs a 'gap year' style programme for overseas players, specifically aimed at school leavers. The academy, which is accredited by SA Rugby and backed by a strategic partnership with the Sharks, offers a full-time, three-year course designed for young people with a passion for rugby and a desire to forge a career in the sport. Players such as Keegan Daniel, Ryan Kankowski, Patrick Lambie, Tendai Mtawarira, Lwazi Mvovo, JP Pietersen and François Steyn are all graduates of the programme.

The Sharks Region
 

The Sharks catchment covers the province of KwaZulu-Natal. The two main cities from which most of its players are drawn are Durban and Pietermaritzburg.

Current squad

The following players have been included so far in the Sharks squad for the 2023 Currie Cup Premier Division:

Springboks (past and present)

 Cameron Christian
 Alf Walker
 Bill Payn
 Bertram van der Plank
 Bill Zeller
 Taffy Townsend
 Wally Clarkson
 Phil Nel
 Jacko Tod
 Ebbo Bastard
 Pat Lyster
 Cecil Moss
 Roy Dryburgh
 Keith Oxlee
 Ormond Taylor
 Don Walton
 Trix Truter
 Snowy Suter
 Tommy Bedford
 Rodney Gould
 Hannes Viljoen
 Piston van Wyk
 Ian McCallum
 Derek van den Berg
 Wynand Claassen
 Rudi Visagie
 Lood Muller
 Hugh Reece-Edwards
 Wahl Bartmann
 Robert du Preez (scrumhalf)
 John Allan
 André Joubert
 Steve Atherton
 Henry Honiball
 Guy Kebble
 Gary Teichmann
 Joel Stransky
 Adrian Garvey
 Jeremy Thomson
 James Small
 Pieter Muller
 Johan Ackerman
 Deon Kayser
 Warren Brosnihan
 Mark Andrews
 Wayne Fyvie
 Etienne Fynn
 Ollie le Roux
 Warren Britz
 AJ Venter
 Albert van den Berg
 André Snyman
 Robbi Kempson
 Percy Montgomery
 Ricardo Loubscher
 Stefan Terblanche
 Lukas van Biljon
 Trevor Halstead
 Craig Davidson
 John Smit
 Shaun Sowerby
 Deon Carstens
 Solly Tyibilika
 Butch James
 Henno Mentz
 Brent Russell
 BJ Botha
 Johann Muller
 Ruan Pienaar
 JP Pietersen
 Francois Steyn
 Ryan Kankowski
 Tendai Mtawarira
 Odwa Ndungane
 Bismarck du Plessis
 Jannie du Plessis
 Adrian Jacobs
 Waylon Murray
 Keegan Daniel
 Patrick Lambie
 Willem Alberts
 Lourens Adriaanse
 Lwazi Mvovo
 Marcell Coetzee
 Pieter-Steph du Toit
 Stephan Lewies
 Cobus Reinach
 Jean-Luc du Preez
 Curwin Bosch
 Dan du Preez
 Louis Schreuder
 Lukhanyo Am
 Makazole Mapimpi
 André Esterhuizen
 Thomas du Toit
 Akker van der Merwe
 Robert du Preez (fly-half)
 S'busiso Nkosi
 Jaden Hendrikse
 Ox Nché
 Aphelele Fassi
 Roy McLean former fly-half, also played for SA cricket team, the Proteas.

Finals results

Currie Cup

The Sharks won eight Currie Cup competitions:

The Sharks also finished as runner-up on twelve occasions:

References

External links
 Official website
 Sharksworld - Fan site dedicated to the Sharks rugby teams
 Cape Town Sharks Supporters Club - Official website of the Sharks supporters club in Cape Town, South Africa
 Cape Town Sharks Supporters Club on Facebook - Facebook page of the Sharks supporters club in Cape Town, South Africa
 Durban Sharks Supporters Club - Official website of the Sharks supporters club in Durban, South Africa
 East Rand Sharks Supporters Club - Official website of the Sharks supporters club in East Rand, South Africa
 Gauteng Central Sharks Supporters Club - Official website of the Sharks supporters club in Gauteng, South Africa
 Pretoria Sharks Supporters Club - Official website of the Sharks supporters club in Pretoria, South Africa

South African rugby union teams
Sport in Durban
Sport in KwaZulu-Natal
1890 establishments in the Colony of Natal
Rugby clubs established in 1890